Pelagophycidae is a subclass of heterokont algae.It is the sister group of the axodines. Together, they form the class Dictyochophyceae.

All known species are marine. They can be single-celled (coccoid or flagellate), palmelloid or filamentous. Some members (Pelagomonas) belong to picoplankton, and some other (Sarcinochrysis) are macroscopic attached organisms.

The subclass contains 13 genera, 3 families and 2 orders (2017):
 Order Pelagomonadales Andersen & Saunders 1993
 Family Pelagomonadaceae Andersen & Saunders 1993
 genus Ankylochrysis Billard 1995
 genus Aureococcus Hargraves & Sieburth 1988
 genus Chrysophaeum Lewis & Bryan 1941 non Taylor 1951
 genus Pelagococcus Norris 1977
 genus Pelagomonas Andersen & Saunders 1993
 Order Sarcinochrysidales Gayral & Billard 1977
 Family Chrysocystaceae Melkonian, Yoon & Andersen 2018
 genus Chrysocystis Lobban, Honda & Chihara 1995
 genus Chrysoreinhardia Billard 2000
 genus Sungminbooa Yoon & Andersen 2018
 Family Sarcinochrysidaceae Gayral & Billard 1977
 genus Andersenia Wetherbee & Waller 2015
 genus Arachnochrysis Andersen & Han 2018
 genus Aureoscheda Wynne & Andersen 2014
 genus Aureoumbra Stockwell et al. 1997
 genus Chrysonephos Taylor 1952
 genus Nematochrysopsis Billard 2000
 genus Pelagospilus Andersen & Graf 2018
 genus Sarcinochrysis Geitler 1930
 genus Sargassococcus Andersen & Han 2018

It is expected that molecular studies will add more species to this list.

References

Algae classes
Heterokont classes
Ochrophyta